The Source is a metaphysical concept created by writer-artist Jack Kirby for his Fourth World series of comic books. It first appeared in New Gods #1 (February 1971).

History
The Source may be considered the consciousness of the DC Universe, in which it is the non-religious equivalent to Buddha-nature or Purusha or the Presence. It is the source of all that exists. Mostly associated with the New Gods, the Source was the supposed origin of the Godwave that is believed  to have been responsible for creating and empowering the "Gods" of the DC Universe with their divine abilities. It also seems to be partially responsible for the ability of DC residents to develop superpowers, especially those which defy physics. Lying at the edge of the known universe in the Promethean Galaxy is the Source Wall, which protects the Source, and traps all those who attempt to pass beyond it. DC Comics has kept the Source out of the main continuum of its storytelling; therefore, not much is known concretely about its many aspects. In the Superman-Batman graphic novel Torment (2008), Superman is sent into the Source by Desaad using Highfather's staff to create a boom tube there. Batman later uses the staff to break through the Source Wall.

Death of the New Gods

While investigating the death of the New Gods, Metron encountered the Source. The Source revealed it was behind the deaths to build a new "Fifth World". It revealed that the most powerful gods of three pantheons of the Second World—the "Old Gods"—attacked it and caused it to split into separate beings. The other being evolved into the Anti-Life entity. In retribution, the Source destroyed the Old Gods and created the New Gods. However, its diminished state caused the New Gods to be flawed. The Source sought to reunite with its other half and start anew. It took advantage of the actions of Alexander Luthor and Rip Hunter to create the 52 worlds of the multiverse to ease the reunion. Using its agent, the Infinity Man, to kill the New Gods and store their souls in a second Source Wall and Mister Miracle as the user of the Anti-Life Equation, the Source was able to breach the primary Source Wall and reunited with its Anti-Life other half. With all the New Gods dead but one, the Source traveled to Apokolips to confront the final god, Darkseid, and complete his task. Darkseid had devised a method to tap into the power of the souls of the New Gods which were being stored in the second Source Wall, giving him equal footing with the Source, until Superman intervened, allowing the Source to deploy his trump card, Orion, who shared Darkseid's access to this power. While Darkseid and Orion fought, with Orion eventually defeating him, the Source slammed New Genesis and Apokolips together creating a single planet, with one half similar to Apokolips and the other to New Genesis. When this was over, the Source told Superman that his work was done, and that he would be leaving this plane of existence.

DC Rebirth
The Source's origin is retold in DC Rebirth, when twenty billion years ago, the Source sent Perpetua to create new systems of life within the greater omniverse. While Perpetua complied, she also did it to bring down her masters by creating something meant to live forever. Thus, she created the first Multiverse by using the Seven Hidden Forces of the Universe to be a self-sustaining weapon against her masters and also created her children from the Overvoid, to monitor each realms of matter within her Multiverse. Five billion years later, Perpetua merged the Humans and the Martians with their worlds to create an army of Apex Predator meant to live and fight for eternity in order to prepare herself to go to war against the Judges of the Source. Her sons alerted the Judges of the Source on her actions and they sent a cosmic raptor to seal her and the Totality of her powers in the Source Wall which the raptor created.

Following the destruction of the Green Lantern Corps and having absorbed the energy of the Godstorm, John Stewart has increased his powers to a level never seen before, elevating him to practical godhood. As John overflows with power to the point it seems as though he's dissipating, a mysterious voice calls to him saying "You know me John. Everybody does." Standing before the ascended Lantern is a physical manifestation of the Source, which has appeared to John in the form of Jack Kirby. Though John can't believe what he's seeing, the Source presses on saying "Everything in existence knows me."

In other media

 Many have speculated that "Force" from Star Wars was inspired by the Source. In Chris Taylor's book How Star Wars Conquered the Universe: The Past, Present, and Future of a Multibillion Dollar Franchise, he notes the similarity between the Source and the Force in George Lucas's Star Wars and suggests Lucas may have been influenced by the comic series.
 In the Justice League episode "Twilight", when discussing possible military action against Apokolips, the Highfather says he "must commune with the Source" before making a decision of such importance. Later, he is shown kneeling in front of a stone wall with flames upon it. In Justice League Unlimited, passage beyond the Source wall could only be survived by a "12th level intellect". Lex Luthor was able to enter and exit the Source, stating to Metron that he was "overqualified". Behind the Source wall resided all the secrets to the universe including the Anti-Life Equation sought by Darkseid.
 In Injustice: Gods Among Us series, Brother Eye satellite is revealed to be equipped with the latest Source energy scanners to detect fluctuations in the Multiverse, allowing it to detect potential crisis on various alternate Earth's in the introductory cutscene for Multiverse mode.

See also
 List of New Gods

References

External links
 DCU Guide: The Source
 List of New Gods Terminology

1971 in comics
Fourth World (comics)